Donald Greenlees (born 14 January 1875) was a Scottish professional footballer who played as a half-back for St Mirren in Scotland and Southampton in England around the turn of the 20th century.

Football career
Born in Bridgeton, Glasgow, Greenlees started his professional career with nearby St Mirren where he gained a reputation as "one of the best half-backs in Scotland".

In May 1899, Greenlees moved to southern England to join Southern League champions Southampton. He made his debut for the Saints at The Dell, taking the place of Samuel Meston at right-half for a 5–1 victory over Queens Park Rangers on 21 October 1899. Greenlees was never able to command a regular place in the Southampton line-up and was used as an understudy for fellow Scots Meston, Peter Meehan and Bob Petrie, making a total of eight appearances.

After one season on the south coast, Greenlees rejoined St Mirren F.C.|St Mirren in the 1900 close-season, resuming what became a long-running half-back partnership with Michael McAvoy and Walter Bruce (the latter gradually replaced by Robert Robertson). By the time of his departure in 1907, Greenlees had made well over 200 appearances for the  Paisley club in the major competitions; he then had a short spell with regional rivals Morton. He returned to Southampton in 1908 and settled in the Shirley Warren area of the town.

Greenlees represented the Scottish League once, in 1904.

References

1875 births
Year of death missing
Footballers from Glasgow
People from Bridgeton, Glasgow
Scottish footballers
Association football wing halves
Southampton F.C. players
St Mirren F.C. players
Greenock Morton F.C. players
Scottish Football League players
Southern Football League players
Scottish Football League representative players